The Oceanport School District is a community public school district that serves students in pre-kindergarten through eighth grade from Oceanport, in Monmouth County, New Jersey, United States. The district also includes students from Sea Bright, who attend as part of a sending/receiving relationship.

As of the 2018–19 school year, the district, comprising two schools, had an enrollment of 599 students and 61.0 classroom teachers (on an FTE basis), for a student–teacher ratio of 9.8:1.

The district is classified by the New Jersey Department of Education as being in District Factor Group "GH", the third-highest of eight groupings. District Factor Groups organize districts statewide to allow comparison by common socioeconomic characteristics of the local districts. From lowest socioeconomic status to highest, the categories are A, B, CD, DE, FG, GH, I and J.

For ninth through twelfth grades, public school students attend Shore Regional High School, a regional high school that also serves students from the constituent districts of Monmouth Beach, Sea Bright and West Long Branch. The high school is located in West Long Branch and is part of the Shore Regional High School District. As of the 2018–19 school year, the high school had an enrollment of 649 students and 57.2 classroom teachers (on an FTE basis), for a student–teacher ratio of 11.3:1.

Awards and recognition
During the 2009–10 school year, Maple Place Middle School was awarded the National Blue Ribbon School Award of Excellence by the United States Department of Education, the highest award an American school can receive.

Schools 
Schools in the district (with 2018–19 enrollment data from the National Center for Education Statistics) are:
Wolf Hill Elementary School with 342 students in pre-Kindergarten through 4th grade
Mark Maglione, Principal
Maple Place Middle School with 253 students in grades 5 - 8 
Matthew Howell, Principal

Administration
Core members of the district's administration are:
Laura Godlesky, Superintendent
Valery Petrone, Business Administrator / Board Secretary

Board of education
The district's board of education, with nine members, sets policy and oversees the fiscal and educational operation of the district through its administration. As a Type II school district, the board's trustees are elected directly by voters to serve three-year terms of office on a staggered basis, with three seats up for election each year held (since 2012) as part of the November general election.

References

External links 
Oceanport School District

Oceanport School District, National Center for Education Statistics

Oceanport, New Jersey
New Jersey District Factor Group GH
School districts in Monmouth County, New Jersey